PCN or pcn may refer to:

Arts and entertainment
 Pennsylvania Cable Network, non-profit cable television network of Pennsylvania, US
 Personal Computer News, a defunct computer magazine
 PCN (band), a Mexican metal band

Organisations
 Partido de Conciliación Nacional, former name of the National Coalition political party in El Salvador
 Partidul Comuniştilor (Nepecerişti), the Communist Party in Romania

Science and technology
 Process control network, a communications network that transmits instructions and data between control and measurement units and SCADA equipment
 Penicillin (PCN)

 Pavement classification number, a code classifying types of surface at airports
 Polychlorinated naphthalene, an organic pollutant
 Potato cyst nematode, an agricultural pest
 Program Composition Notation, a language for parallel programming
 Polycycnis (Pcn), a genus of orchid
 Personal communications network, mobile telephone system, Europe

Other uses
 Pecked curvilinear nucleated, in archaeology, a form of prehistoric rock carving
 Penalty Charge Notice, a Fixed Penalty Notice issued by parking attendants and other civil enforcement officers
 Putnam City North High School
 Post Christum natum (modern Latin: p.C.n., "After the Birth of Christ")
 Personnel Certification in Non-Destructive Testing, maintained by the BINDT in the UK
 Product change notification, document issued by a manufacturers to inform customers about a product change
 Paisley Canal railway station (Station code), Paisley, Scotland